Tagetes campanulata is a South American species of plants in the family Asteraceae. It is found in Argentina (Provinces of Catamarca, Jujuy, La Rioja) and Bolivia (Tarija Department).

References

campanulata
Flora of Argentina
Flora of Bolivia
Plants described in 1874